Together Alone is the fourth studio album by New Zealand-Australian recording artists Crowded House. It was released in October 1993 and was their first album to feature multi-instrumentalist Mark Hart as a full band member. Unlike the band's first three albums, which were recorded in the US and Australia and produced by Mitchell Froom, Together Alone was recorded in New Zealand with producer Youth. Six singles were released from Together Alone, including "Distant Sun", which was a top 10 hit in New Zealand and Canada, and "Locked Out" which reached number 12 on the UK singles chart and number 8 on the US Modern Rock chart, the latter on the strength of the song's inclusion on the soundtrack of the 1994 film Reality Bites.

Background
Together Alone was mainly recorded at Neil Finn's friends Nigel and Jody Harrocks' house at Karekare Beach in New Zealand, with additional recording in Melbourne, Australia at both Periscope and Platinum Studios. The album's opening track was named "Kare Kare". Paul Hester said, "We flew in Youth and an engineer called Greg Hunter straight off the streets of Brixton to Karekare Beach, New Zealand – miles from anywhere, no shops, no nothing. They were in shock for days. Didn't know where the fuck they were."

AllMusic noted that Together Alone is "more experimental and musically varied than any of their previous releases" and cited the addition of Mark Hart to the band's line-up and new producer Youth as reasons for this. The album features more complex, layered guitar and keyboard arrangements than on Crowded House's previous works. The title track features a New Zealand Māori choir and log drummers and was co-written by Ngapo "Bub" Wehi of the Te Waka Huia Cultural Group Choir, who also provide backing vocals on "In My Command" and "Catherine Wheels".

"Catherine Wheels" was written by Neil and Tim Finn while with Split Enz and was originally titled "The First to Say Gone". The final version included input from bass player Nick Seymour, which earned him a co-writing credit, one of only five he has with Crowded House. (The others are "Recurring Dream" and "Help Is Coming" from Afterglow, "Newcastle Jam" from the Special Edition Live Album and "Isolation" from Intriguer.)

Together Alone topped the album chart in New Zealand, reached number two in Australia and number four in the United Kingdom. Due to its inclusion on the Reality Bites soundtrack, the song "Locked Out" was bundled with The Knack's "My Sharona", which also features in the film, as a promotional jukebox single. The video single release of "Nails in My Feet" featured a documentary of the making of Together Alone entitled Footage from the Together Alone Recording Session.

The Japanese edition contained the bonus track "You Can Touch" which later appeared on the compilation Afterglow.

Cover art
Nick Seymour created the album cover, which features a red car, possibly a taxi. It contains Jesus, a golden figure and a third occupant in the back of the car of whom only an arm, clad in a striped shirt, is visible. The car is surrounded by a golden halo and has fluffy dice hanging from the rear view mirror. The cover of the 2007 single "Don't Stop Now" has a similar red car and the song's video features the car during its animated sequences. The album artwork was co-designed by Seymour and Margo Chase. It incorporates photography, by Youri Lenquette and Merlyn Rosenberg, of the band and of landscapes including Karekare beach. Vinyl pressings of Together Alone have a golden border (much like the halo around the red car) surrounding the outside of the cover.

Critical reception

Writing in The Michigan Daily, Heather Phares called it a "catchy and spiritual listen that runs the gamut of emotions, from the hyperkinetic 'Locked Out' to the hushed 'Distant Sun'." She credited producer Youth for making it a "challenging yet listenable album."

Track listing

A limited edition of the album in some territories featured a bonus disc of live tracks from their previous three albums:

 "World Where You Live" – 5:30
 "Mean to Me" – 4:06
 "Sister Madly" – 5:42
 "Better Be Home Soon" – 3:23
 "It's Only Natural" – 3:52
 "Weather with You" – 5:19

2016 reissue

Note
 * When compiling the deluxe edition a longer edited version of "Together Alone" was accidentally used, with additional chatter from the recording session at the end of the track included.

Note
 *Previously released

Personnel

Crowded House
 Neil Finn – vocals, acoustic and electric guitars, piano, keyboards
 Nick Seymour – bass, backing vocals
 Paul Hester – drums, percussion, vocals
 Mark Hart – keyboards, electric and acoustic guitars, lap steel guitar, mandolin, backing vocals

Additional musicians
 Eddie Rayner – Keyboards on "Kare Kare" & "Pineapple Head"
 Noel Crombie – Percussion on "Private Universe"
 Geoffrey Hales – Percussion on "Fingers of Love" & "Locked Out"
 Tim Finn – Background vocals on "In My Command" & "Catherine Wheels"
 Sharon Finn – Background vocals on "Black and White Boy", "Fingers of Love" & "Private Universe"
 Dror Erez – Accordion on "Walking on the Spot"
 Te Waka Huia Cultural Group Choir – Vocals on "Together Alone", "In My Command" & "Catherine Wheels"
 Joe, Tereo, Martie, Jamee, Benjamin – Log Drummers on "Together Alone" & "Private Universe"
 Clyde Dixon, Stephen Bremner, Laura Astridge, David Bremner, Shaun Jarrett – Brass Band on "In My Command" & "Together Alone"

Production
 Youth – Producer
 Bob Clearmountain – Mixer
 Greg Hunter – Engineer
 Nick Morgan, Graeme Myre, Angus Davidson, Chris Corr, Kalju Tonuma – Additional engineering
 Dugald McAndrew – Equipment & additional engineering
 Matt Austin – Programming

Charts

Weekly charts

Year-end charts

Certifications

Further reading

References

External links
Crowded House official website

1993 albums
Crowded House albums
Albums produced by Youth (musician)